Ələtli is a village and municipality in the Hajigabul Rayon of Azerbaijan.  It has a population of 380.  The municipality consists of the villages of Ələtli and Bürvənd.

References 

Populated places in Hajigabul District